Roma is an opera in five acts by Jules Massenet to a French libretto by Henri Cain based on the play Rome vaincue by Dominique-Alexandre Parodi.  It was first performed at the Opéra de Monte Carlo on 17 February 1912.

Roma was the last opera by Massenet to premiere in his lifetime. Three operas were subsequently premiered posthumously: Panurge (1913), Cléopâtre (1914) and Amadis (1922).  The piece has not survived into the modern operatic repertoire, but has been revived recently and recorded by the Teatro la Fenice in Venice.

Roles

Synopsis
The story takes place in Ancient Rome, following the Carthaginian triumph at the Battle of Cannae.  Fausta, daughter of Fabius, has allowed the sacred fires to burn out at the Temple of Vesta, profaning the sanctuary.  After failed attempts to escape her fate, to be buried alive wrapped in a black veil, Fausta returns to Rome to accept her punishment.  As she is being led to execution, her blind grandmother, Posthumia, hands her Fabius' dagger.  Fausta's hands are bound, however, and Posthumia must kill her granddaughter to spare her from the burial and expiate the sacrilege.

References

Notes

Operas
Operas by Jules Massenet
French-language operas
1912 operas
Opera world premieres at the Opéra de Monte-Carlo
Operas set in ancient Rome
Operas based on plays